South Molton was a parliamentary constituency centred on the small town of South Molton in Devon, in the South West of England.  It returned one Member of Parliament (MP)  to the House of Commons of the Parliament of the United Kingdom.

The constituency was created for the 1885 general election, and abolished for the 1950 general election, when it was largely replaced by Torrington.

Boundaries 
1885–1918: The Municipal Borough of South Molton, and the Sessional Divisions of Crediton, Great Torrington, and South Molton.

1918–1950: The Municipal Boroughs of Great Torrington, Okehampton, and South Molton, the Urban District of Crediton, and the Rural Districts of Crediton, Okehampton, South Molton, and Torrington.

Members of Parliament

Election results

Elections in the 1880s

Elections in the 1890s
Viscount Lymington was elevated to the peerage, becoming Earl of Portsmouth, causing a by-election.

Elections in the 1900s

Elections in the 1910s 

General Election 1914–15:
Another General Election was required to take place before the end of 1915. The political parties had been making preparations for an election to take place from 1914 and by the end of this year, the following candidates had been selected; 
 Liberal: George Lambert, 
 Conservative:

Elections in the 1920s

Elections in the 1930s

Elections in the 1940s 
General Election 1939–40:
Another General Election was required to take place before the end of 1940. The political parties had been making preparations for an election to take place from 1939 and by the end of this year, the following candidates had been selected; 
Liberal National: George Lambert

References
Notes

Sources
 Craig, F. W. S. (1983). British parliamentary election results 1918-1949 (3 ed.). Chichester: Parliamentary Research Services. .
 

Parliamentary constituencies in Devon (historic)
Constituencies of the Parliament of the United Kingdom established in 1885
Constituencies of the Parliament of the United Kingdom disestablished in 1950
South Molton